{
  "type": "ExternalData",
  "service": "page",
  "title": "ROCEEH/Micoquian.map"
}

The Micoquien is an early middle paleolithic industry, that is found in the Eemian and in an early episode of the Würm glaciation (about 130,000 to 60,000 BCE). The Micoquien is distinguished technologically by the appearance of distinctly asymmetrical bifaces. Its discoverer and namer was the archeologist and art trader Otto Hauser. Hauser then sold a great number of so-called Micoque-wedges that he found in excavations in La Micoque (in Les Eyzies-de-Tayac-Sireuil, Dordogne, France) to museums and collectors.

The specially formed handaxes from La Micoque exhibited an often rounded base. The problem with the term Micoquien is that later excavations have revealed an older time placement for the La Micoque axes, which are now dated in the Riss glaciation.

A wider artifact from the Micoquien is the Keilmesser (bifacially worked knife), which has a clearer chronology in Central Europe. From this some archeologists have proposed substituting the term Keilmesser group for Micoquien.

Micoquien artifacts are distributed across all of Eastern Europe and Central Europe. In Germany they can be found at Balver Höhle and Lonetal.

Notes

References
Debénath, A.; Rigaud, J.-Ph. (1986), Le gisement de La Micoque.- in: Rigaud, J.-Ph. (dir.): Informa-tions archéologiques: circonscription d'Aquitaine; Gallia Préhist. 29; CNRS; Paris; 236-237.
Debénath, A.; Rigaud, J.-Ph. (1991), La Micoque.- Gallia Informations Préhistoire et Histoire; 1991-1; CNRS; Paris; 21-25.
Hauser, O. (1916), La Micoque, die Kultur einer neuen Diluvialrasse. Leipzig.
Peyrony, D. (1933), La Micoque et ses diverses industries.- XVe Congrès International d'Anthropolo-gie et d'Archéologie Préhistorique (suite), Ve Session de l'Institut International d'Anthropologie; Paris 20-27 Septembre 1931; Librairie E. Nourry; Paris; Extrait; 1-6.
Peyrony, D. (1938), La Micoque. Les fouilles récentes. Leur signification.- Bulletin de la Société Pré-historique Française 35; Paris; 121; 257-288.
Rosendahl, G. (1999), La Micoque und das Micoquien in den altsteinzeitlichen Sammlungen des Reiss-Museums Mannheim.- Mannh. Geschichtsblätter N. F. 6; Ubstadt-Weiher; 315-351.

External links

 Geröllgeräte-Industrien
 Rosendahl, G. (2004), Die oberen Schichten von La Micoque.

Industries (archaeology)
Paleolithic Europe
Archaeological cultures of Europe
Middle Paleolithic
Neanderthals